Among the awards won by the American musician Busta Rhymes are The Source Awards (1999), Soul Train Music Awards (2000), the Smash Hits Poll Winners Party (2005),  Myx Music Award (2006), and the BET Hip Hop Awards (2006 and 2011). He has been nominated many times for the Grammy Award and the MTV Video Music Award.

Billboard Awards

Billboard Music Award
Busta Rhymes has been nominated for one Billboard Music Award during his solo career.

Billboard R&B/Hip-Hop Awards

BET Hip Hop Awards

|-
| rowspan="2"|
| rowspan="2"| Himself
| Best Live Performance
| 
|-
| Move the Crowd Award
| 
|-
| 2009
| Himself
| Best Live Performer
| 
|-
| rowspan="2"| 2010
| "All I Do Is Win (Remix)" (with DJ Khaled, Rick Ross, T-Pain, P. Diddy, Fabolous, Fat Joe, Jadakiss and Nicki Minaj)
| Reese’s Perfect Combo Award
| 
|-
| rowspan="2"|Himself
| rowspan="2"|Best Live Performer
| 
|-
| rowspan="5"| 2011
| 
|-
| rowspan="4"|"Look at Me Now" (with Chris Brown and Lil Wayne)
| Best Hip Hop Video
| 
|-
| Reese’s Perfect Combo Award
| 
|-
| Sweet 16: Best Featured Verse
| 
|-
| Verizon People’s Champ Award
| 
|-
|}

International Dance Music Awards
The Winter Music Conference was established in 1985. It is a part of the Winter Music Conference, a weeklong electronic music event held annually. Busta Rhymes received one award out of one nomination.

Soul Train Music Awards
Busta Rhymes has won a Soul Train Music Award and has been nominated for two Soul Train Music Awards during his solo career.

American Music Awards
Busta Rhymes has been nominated for one American Music Award during his solo career.

The Source Awards
Busta Rhymes has won a Source Award during his solo career.

Grammy Award
Busta Rhymes has been nominated for 12 Grammy Awards during his solo career.

MTV Video Music Award
Busta Rhymes has been nominated for 16 MTV Video Music Awards during his solo career.

Myx Music Award
The Myx Music Awards is an annual awards ceremony presented by the Philippine music video channel myx. Busta Rhymes received one nomination and won one.

|-
| style="text-align:center;" | 2006 || "Don't Cha" (featuring Busta Rhymes) || rowspan=2|Favorite International Music Video|| 
|-

Smash Hits Poll Winners Party
The Smash Hits Poll Winners Party were an awards ceremony which ran from 1988 to 2005. Each award winner was voted by readers of the Smash Hits magazine. Busta Rhymes received one award from one nomination.

References

Lists of awards received by American musician